Blepharocerus chilensis is a species of snout moth in the genus Blepharocerus. It was described by Philipp Christoph Zeller in 1874, and is known from Chile, from which its species epithet is derived.

References

Moths described in 1874
Chrysauginae
Endemic fauna of Chile